Vuosaari metro station is the ground-level terminus station of the M1 line of the Helsinki Metro. It serves the district of Vuosaari in East Helsinki.

The station was opened on 31 August 1998 and was designed by the architect firm Esa Piironen Oy. It is located 1.2 kilometers east of Rastila metro station.

In 2011, a 1.4 kilometer-long service rail was created from the end of the Vuosaari station to Vuosaari Harbour. The service rail connects the metro track to the railway network and replaced the previous, longer service rail line that ran through the district of Viikki. The service rail has been used to move heavy maintenance and construction machinery and materials, including those that were related to the Länsimetro project.

A trial run with platform screen doors was conducted at Vuosaari. The project was delayed due to technical and safety related testing.

References

External links

Helsinki Metro stations
Railway stations opened in 1998
1998 establishments in Finland
Vuosaari